Two police officers in West Memphis, Arkansas were shot and killed during a traffic stop on May 20, 2010. Police killed two suspects, 45-year-old Jerry R. Kane Jr. (b. 1964), and his 16-year-old son Joseph T. Kane (b. 1993). The two were later identified as members of the sovereign citizen movement. Footage of the shooting and ensuing shootout with police was shown in a season 5 episode of World's Wildest Police Videos.

Details
Around 11:36 a.m. CDT, West Memphis police officer Bill Evans initiated a traffic stop on a white Plymouth Voyager minivan that was travelling on Interstate 40 eastbound toward Airport Road. According to a spokesperson for the Arkansas State Police, Officer Evans was "running drug interdiction"; the vehicle, driven by Jerry Kane, had unusual  Ohio license plates. Sergeant Brandon Paudert provided backup for Evans. As a sovereign citizen, Jerry Kane did not have a driver's license and his van was not properly registered. He was also carrying a brick of marijuana and there were two arrest warrants for him, one in Ohio and one in New Mexico.

Upon Paudert's arrival at the scene, Evans attempted to frisk Jerry Kane. Suddenly, Kane turned and attacked Evans in a scuffle down an embankment into a ditch. At that moment, Joe Kane emerged from the passenger door of the van and opened fire with an AK-47 variant. Paudert ran to the rear of Evans' police cruiser and returned fire with three shots from his .40-caliber Glock 22 handgun through the windows and taillight of Evans' cruiser, in an attempt to hit Kane firing from the other side. He then took cover behind the hood of his cruiser which was parked directly behind Evans' cruiser. Paudert fired four more times at Kane, but missed. Kane then fired multiple shots from his AK-47 variant through the hood of the car, striking Paudert in the head with a ricochet.

Both officers were fatally wounded; Paudert, 39, died at the scene, and Evans, 38, died at the hospital. The suspects returned to their van and sped away. Vincent Brown, a FedEx driver from Houston, witnessed the shooting and called 911; neither officer could make an "officer down" call due to their fatal injuries.
Approximately 2 hours after the incident, Crittenden County Sheriff Dick Busby and Chief Enforcement Officer W. A. Wren stopped a minivan believed to be the suspects' at a Walmart Supercenter. Officers Busby and Wren were wounded in gunfire exchanged with the suspects and were later hospitalized in critical condition.

Wildlife Officer Michael K. Neal, responding to the brief standoff, rammed the suspect's vehicle, preventing their escape and saving the lives of Busby and Wren. Officer Neal exchanged fire with the Kanes through his windshield using his patrol rifle, killing Jerry Kane and wounding Joe Kane before exiting his vehicle and continuing the gun battle. Dozens of officers then surrounded the van, and after several more minutes of gunfire, Joe Kane was shot to death by police. For his heroics, Officer Neal was awarded Law Enforcement Officer of the Year by the NRA. Michael K. Neal's Truck is on permanent display at the National Law Enforcement Museum in Washington D.C.

Perpetrators
Jerry Kane and Joseph Kane were identified by Arkansas State Police the day after the shootings. 

A lifelong resident of Ohio, Jerry Kane ran a debt evasion business and traveled the country giving paying seminars on methods of "forestalling foreclosures", lecturing that money and home loans are fictitious, and that people can simply sign a quitclaim deed and live in their houses mortgage-free. His concepts were based on the fraudulent schemes advocated by the redemption movement.

According to his girlfriend, Kane's resentment of the government began in the late 1990s, when one of his daughters died at the age of six weeks of infant death syndrome and an autopsy was performed against his wishes. Kane grew distrustful of authorities, gave up his driver's license and employment as a trucker, and became increasingly antagonistic toward Ohio law enforcement. Based on a 2004 conversation with Jerry Kane, Clark County Sheriff Gene Kelly had expressed concern that Kane would pose a dangerous threat to law enforcement officers. According to Kelly, Kane had complained about being "enslaved" by a judge who had sentenced him to serve six days of community service for driving with an expired license plate and no seat belt. 

In 2006, Kane was indicted for forgery and theft of a car by deception in Montgomery County, Ohio, and there was an outstanding warrant at the time of his death. Kane had said that driver's licences were a "debt contract", and a month before the shooting, he was arrested in New Mexico for driving without a license. On an internet radio show, Kane said he was picked up at a "Nazi checkpoint", spent 47 hours in custody, and planned to sue for $100 per hour of custody. In fact, he was released on $1,500 bond and did not appear for his court date three days before the shooting.

Around 2006, Kane started posting about "redemption" theories on a sovereign citizen forum. In 2007, his wife died of pneumonia. Around 2008, at the height of the mortgage crisis, Kane shifted from being an internet poster to starting his own debt-elimination seminars business. 

Joseph Kane traveled the country with his father, whom he assisted on his seminars. He was homeschooled and by age 9, could recite the Bill of Rights and carried a toy gun everywhere he went. According to Sheriff Kelly, "the child had been taught not to trust law enforcement." 

Jerry Kane had recently begun a relationship with a Florida woman whom he had met at one of his seminars, and who also adhered to sovereign citizen ideology: shortly before the shooting, she had been involved in a protracted legal battle with her county of residence because she refused to pay a $20 dog-licensing fee. 

Jerry Kane was unsuccessful as a motivational speaker; his seminars were sparsely attended and he had not gained much notoriety in the sovereign citizen environment. He had decided to cut his tour off early and, when the shooting took place, was en route to Florida where his last seminar was scheduled. After that, he planned to settle in Florida and start a new life there with his girlfriend.

Aftermath 

According to the autopsy, officers and eyewitnesses testimony, Officer Evans was shot eight times in the chest, back, and arms. Sgt. Paudert was shot fourteen times in the head, arms, legs, both hands and shoulders. Joseph Kane was shot multiple times in the chest, head, back, and arms by Officer Neal. Jerry Kane Jr. was hit multiple times in the back, arms, and legs by Officer Neal. Crittenden County Sheriff Dick Busby was hit once in the left shoulder. Chief Enforcement Officer W. A. Wren was hit multiple times in the abdomen.

See also
List of American police officers killed in the line of duty

Notes

References

2010 active shooter incidents in the United States
2010 mass shootings in the United States
Mass shootings in the United States
2010 murders in the United States
American police officers killed in the line of duty
West Memphis, Arkansas
Deaths by firearm in Arkansas
History of Arkansas
Murder in Arkansas
People shot dead by law enforcement officers in the United States
2010 in Arkansas
Filmed killings
Criminal duos
Crimes in Arkansas
Incidents involving the sovereign citizen movement
Attacks in the United States in 2010
Mass shootings in Arkansas
Murder committed by minors
Law enforcement in Arkansas
May 2010 crimes in the United States